The 1927–28 season was the 31st in the history of the Western Football League.

The Division One champions this season were Plymouth Argyle Reserves for the first time in their history. The winners of Division Two were Trowbridge Town.

Division One
The number of clubs in Division One was reduced from twelve to eleven after Poole and Swindon Town Reserves left the league. Torquay United also left, having been promoted to The Football League.

Two new teams joined the league:
Salisbury City, rejoining after leaving the league in 1906. This is not the same club as the later incarnation of Salisbury City F.C.
Torquay United Reserves
Taunton United changed their name to Taunton Town. This is not the same club as the current incarnation of Taunton Town F.C.

Division Two
Division Two was reduced from ten to eight clubs after Frome Town joined the Somerset Senior League, and Lovells Athletic Reserves also left. No new teams joined Division Two.

References

1927-28
4
1927–28 in Welsh football